Speed Skating was inducted at the Youth Olympic Games at the inaugural edition in 2012, with 8 events. For the 2016 and 2020 editions the number of events was reduced to 7. A mixed event consisting of a team sprint race was included on the program.

Medal table 
As of the 2020 Winter Youth Olympics.

See also 

 Speed skating at the Winter Olympics

References 

Sports at the Winter Youth Olympics
 
Youth Olympic Games
International speed skating competitions